William Leonard "Bill" Norvel, SSJ (c. 1935–) is an African-American Catholic priest who served as the 13th and first Black superior general of the Society of St. Joseph of the Sacred Heart, also known as the Josephites. The society was founded to serve African Americans in 1893. Norvel, ordained to the priesthood in 1965, became superior in 2011—the first Black man to head a Catholic religious community in the United States.

He is also known for his work during the Black Catholic Movement, in which he helped spread the use of Black Gospel music and other elements of Black spirituality in African-American Catholic parishes throughout the country. He is said to have established the first Catholic gospel choirs in history.

Biography 
Born in Biloxi in the mid-1930s to William and Velma Norvel. The younger William was raised in Pascagoula, Mississippi at St. Peter the Apostle Catholic Church; he attended St. Peter's Elementary and Our Mother of Sorrows High School. He initially sought to become a priest while a teenager, but was dissuaded by the Diocese of Jackson, representatives of which told him that there was "no place in the Church" for him as an African-American priest. (Since the introduction of Catholicism to North America in the 16th century, Black men had been largely barred from Catholic seminaries in the New World, and especially the United States.)

Norvel was eventually encouraged by his Josephite pastor to pursue membership in that religious community, which serves African Americans specifically. He entered Epiphany Apostolic College in New York and later matriculated to St Joseph's Seminary in Washington, D.C., where he received his Master of Divinity. 

Norvel was ordained in 1965 at the Cathedral Basilica of St. Louis in New Orleans, Louisiana and was first assigned to Holy Family Catholic Church in Natchez, Mississippi. There, he faced opposition from the Ku Klux Klan and other elements of anti-Black racism. He later served in parishes in DC; Mobile, Alabama; Baltimore, Maryland; Baton Rouge, Louisiana; Los Angeles, California; and Pascagoula. He also taught at St. Augustine High School, the Josephites' all-boys Black Catholic institution in New Orleans, the University of Notre Dame, and Loyola Marymount University.

Norvel is perhaps best known for his efforts to establish Black liturgical patrimony in the Catholic Church, wherein he traveled the country establishing gospel choirs at African-American Catholic parishes. While serving as the Josephites' consultor general and president of the National Black Catholic Clergy Caucus, Norvel also served as a contributor to Lead Me, Guide Me: The African American Catholic Hymnal, released in 1987 by GIA Publications as the first of its kind.

Norvel's liturgical work came during the Black Catholic Movement, first launched in 1968 by the National Black Catholic Clergy Caucus in the wake of the assassination of Martin Luther King Jr. Norvel was one of the many priests, religious, and laypeople who sought to combat racism in the US Catholic Church and solidify a uniquely Black Catholic expression of Christianity.

Later in his priesthood, Norvel spearheaded the Josephites' efforts to establish a vocations hub in Nigeria, where desire for the priesthood was stronger than in the United States; the society had struggled to attract new members following a mass exodus of the society's seminarians in the early 1970s due to conflicts related to the Black power movement. Norvel's efforts overseas were successful, attracting various applicants while Norvel himself resided in the country for five years, introducing African-American liturgy to Nigerian Catholics and opening a house of formation. 

Following his work in Nigeria, Norvel became pastor of Our Lady of Perpetual Help in DC. While there, he was tapped to become the Josephites' superior general, after 118 years of White leadership in that position. Norvel, 75 years old at the time, had been planning to retire before receiving the request. He accepted and became superior in 2011. He served one term and retired in 2015, the 50th year of his priesthood.

Memberships 
Norvel is a member of the Knights of Peter Claver, the Knights of Columbus and the National Association of Superiors General.

Published works 

 A Hallelujah Song!: Memoir of a Black Catholic Priest from the Jim Crow South

See also 

 Josephites (Maryland)
 Black Catholicism
 St. Joseph's Seminary (Washington, DC)
 Epiphany Apostolic College

References 

Anti-racism in the United States
African-American Roman Catholicism
Josephite Fathers
Society of St. Joseph of the Sacred Heart
American Catholics
Superiors General of the Society of St. Joseph of the Sacred Heart
Catholic religious leaders
Roman Catholic religious leaders
African-American history of Mississippi
African-American history of Maryland
African-American Roman Catholic priests
African-American Catholic superiors general
Epiphany Apostolic College
St. Joseph's Seminary (Washington, DC)